Phillip Leslie Davies (born 8 April 1959), is a British Labour politician and former Leader of Wirral Council.

Education
BA (Hons) Politics, University of Warwick, 1978–81; PhD in Public Policy, University of Strathclyde, 1981-85.
Davies studied at Wirral Met College between 1975 and 1978

Political career

Councillor
Davies was first elected to Wirral Council in 1991 for the then Labour safe seat of Birkenhead. In 2004, he was successfully re-elected to the Birkenhead and Tranmere ward after boundary changes.

Labour group leader
In March 2012, Davies was deputy leader of the Labour group when then leader Steve Foulkes, who lost a vote of confidence as leader of the council in February, stood down citing the "constant stress" of the role. Davies was subsequently elected in his place and was leader of the opposition until Labour took control of the council that May.

On 16 October 2018 he said he was to stand down as both Leader of the Council and councillor for Birkenhead and Tranmere at the next local elections in May 2019. His seat was gained by Steve Hayes of the Green Party on a majority of 1,140 over the Labour candidate.

On 24 June he was made an Honorary Alderman of Wirral Council.

Wirral West parliamentary candidate
Davies was selected as the Labour candidate for the Wirral West Constituency at the 2010 General Election after the incumbent MP, Stephen Hesford, stood down for family reasons. Davies lost to future Secretary of State for Work and Pensions, Esther McVey, by a margin of 2,436.

Merseyside Deputy Police and Crime Commissioner nomination

Davies is currently the only candidate to be selected as deputy to Jane Kennedy, Police and Crime Commissioner for Merseyside. Kennedy, whose previous deputy Emily Spurrell stood down after Kennedy left the Labour Party, was due to stand down at the May 2020 election but had her term extended due to the delay of said election warranting a new deputy. However, after being offered the position, Phil Davies decided to decline the appointment on the grounds that it would require too high a level of commitment, and that he preferred to continue enjoying his retirement.

Electoral history

References

|-

|-

|-

1959 births
Living people
Labour Party (UK) councillors
Members of Wirral Council
Leaders of local authorities of England